Blazing Justice is a 1936 American Western film directed by Albert Herman.

Plot
In a saloon, Ray Healy witnesses three outlaws kill a sheriff, Ray subdues two of them, but one named Max gets away. During the pursuit Max manages to bludgeon an old ranch owner and take his life savings that he had in a money belt.

Cast 
Bill Cody as Ray Healy
Gertrude Messinger as Virginia Peterson
Gordon Griffith as Max
Milburn Morante as Pop, Bearded Barfly
Budd Buster as Bob Peterson, Virginia's Father
Frank Yaconelli as Rusty, Guitar Player

External links 

1936 films
1936 Western (genre) films
American black-and-white films
American Western (genre) films
Films directed by Albert Herman
1930s English-language films
1930s American films